Michaut is a French surname. Notable people with the surname include:

Anne Michaut (born 1972), French sprint canoeist
Auguste-François Michaut (1786–1879), French engraver, medallist and sculptor
Jacques Michaut (born 1946), French Polynesian politician

French-language surnames